Delia Williams (b 1930) was an Australian actor. She was born in England, where she trained at the Old Vic and worked for two years on the West End, as well as a model. She moved to Australia in 1956. She worked a number of times with Annette Andre.

Select TV Credits
The Seagull (1959)
Hamlet (1959)
Wuthering Heights (1959)
Stormy Petrel (1960)
Whiplash (1960)
The Outcasts (1961)

Select Theatre Credits
Dial M for Murder (1957) - tour

Radio Credits
Paradise Place (1957)
Richard II (1959)
'The Loquat Tree'' (1961)

References

External links
Delia Williams at IMDb

20th-century Australian actresses
1930 births
Possibly living people